Mark Baisley (born 1955 in Hastings, Minnesota) is a state senator from Roxborough Park, Colorado. A Republican, Baisley represents Colorado's 4th Senate district. Previously, he represented Colorado House of Representatives District 39, which encompassed parts of Douglas County and all of Teller County.

Background
Baisley earned a bachelor's degree with dual degrees in computer information systems and business administration from Columbia College, Missouri in 1993. He currently works as the president of Slipglass, Inc., an engineering software firm.

Elections
Baisley was first elected as a state representative in the 2018 general elections. In that election, he defeated his Democratic and Libertarian party opponents, winning 62.61% of the vote.

Baisley was re-elected to the state house in 2020.

In 2022, Baisley ran for a seat in the Colorado State Senate. Specifically, he ran to represent Colorado's 4th Senate district. In the general election, he defeated his Democratic Party opponent, winning 60.84% of the vote.

References

External links
 Campaign website
 State House website

21st-century American politicians
Living people
Republican Party Colorado state senators
Republican Party members of the Colorado House of Representatives
People from El Paso County, Colorado
Engineers from Colorado
1955 births
People from Missouri
Columbia College (Missouri) alumni